The 1971–72 season was Chelsea Football Club's fifty-eighth competitive season.

References

External links
 1971–72 season at stamford-bridge.com

1971–72
English football clubs 1971–72 season